The 1951 Soviet Chess Championship was the 19th edition of USSR Chess Championship. Held from 11 November to 14 December 1951 in Moscow. The tournament was won by Paul Keres. The final were preceded by quarter-finals events and four semifinals (at Leningrad, Baku, Sverdlovsky and Lvov).

Table and results

References 

USSR Chess Championships
Championship
Chess
1951 in chess
Chess